The Embassy of Colombia in Vienna is the diplomatic mission of the Republic of Colombia to the Republic of Austria; it is headed by the Ambassador of Colombia to Austria Miguel Camilo Ruíz Blanco. It is located in the Innere Stadt district of Vienna, near the Austrian Parliament, the University of Vienna, the Rathaus, and the Burgtheater, precisely at Stadiongasse 6-8 at the intersection of Bartensteingasse, and it is serviced by the Rathaus station.

Currently, the Embassy is also accredited to the Czech Republic, the Republic of Croatia, the Republic of Slovakia, and the Republic of Slovenia. 

The Embassy takes place in an apartment building that originally was built in the classical style in 1883, designed by Austrian architect Otto Wagner; The Consular Section of Colombia in Vienna is also housed in the same building.

See also
Austria–Colombia relations
Colombia–Czech Republic relations

References

External links
 

Vienna
Colombia
Austria–Colombia relations
Otto Wagner buildings